Kont Diġa is a 2009 Maltese full length feature film, directed by Mark Dingli and produced by Sascha Sammut.

References

 
 
 
 

Maltese drama films
2009 films